The group stage of the AFC Cup (Asian Football Confederation) matches took place between 10 March and 19 May 2009.

Groups

West Asia

Group A

Group B

Group C

Group D

Group E

Al-Majd were found guilty of fielding an ineligible player (Khaled Mansoor Al Baba) in four matches (vs. Al Faisaly (JOR) on 07.04.2009 and 21.04.2009; vs. Dempo SC (IND) on 05.05.2009 and vs. Muharraq (BHR) on 19.05.2009) of the AFC Cup. All these matches have been awarded 3–0 to the teams who played against Al Majd and the club has been fined US$4000 for every match. The player was ineligible because he was registered by the club outside the recognized window(s) for registration as provided for by FIFA and AFC. Al Majd's fine was later withdrawn after appeal.

East Asia

Group F

Group G

Group H

References

Group stage